Schiplaken is a village within the municipality of Boortmeerbeek, in the province of Flemish Brabant, Belgium.

Populated places in Flemish Brabant